This is a complete list of people who have served as Speakers of the Oregon House of Representatives through the most recent session. Oregon became a state on February 14, 1859, with prior sessions of the House organized under the territorial government and the provisional government. Prior to the adoption of the second set of Organic Laws in 1845, the legislative body of the provisional government was the legislative committee, and leaders of that body are not listed below.

As of 2022 and the 81st Oregon Legislative Assembly, Dan Rayfield is serving as the current speaker.

Before statehood

After statehood

See also
List of presidents of the Oregon State Senate

References

 
Speakers
Oregon